Mount Pleasant is an unincorporated community in Perry Township, Martin County, in the U.S. state of Indiana.

History
A post office was established at Mount Pleasant in 1824, and remained in operation until it was discontinued in 1862. The name is likely descriptive.

Geography

References

Unincorporated communities in Martin County, Indiana
Unincorporated communities in Indiana
1824 establishments in Indiana